Bacillus arseniciselenatis is a bacterium first isolated from Mono Lake, California. It is notable for respiring oxyanions of selenium and arsenic. It is spore-forming, rod-shaped and alkaliphile, its type strain being E1H. It is a strict anaerobe.

References

Further reading
Staley, James T., et al. "Bergey's manual of systematic bacteriology, vol. 3."Williams and Wilkins, Baltimore, MD (1989): 2250–2251.

Berkeley, Roger, et al., eds. Applications and systematics of bacillus and relatives. Wiley. com, 2008.

External links

arseniciselenatis
Bacteria described in 1998